Jérôme Phélypeaux (March 1674 – 8 February 1747), comte de (count of) Pontchartrain, was a French statesman, son of Louis Phélypeaux.

He served as a councillor to the parlement of Paris from 1692, and served with his father as Secretary of State of the Maison du Roi and Navy Minister from 1699 onwards. His management of the French Navy was criticised, but recent historiography has reevaluated his contributions. He directed a significant programme of explorations and encouraged the settlement and development of Louisiana. He was responsible for the creation of the Académie des Inscriptions et Belles-Lettres.

His first marriage, in 1697, was with Éléonore Christine de La Rochefoucauld de Roye (known as Mademoiselle de Chefboutonne) (1681–June 1708). Five children were born to this marriage:

Marie Françoise Christine (1698–1701)
Louis François (1700–1708), comte de Maurepas
Jean Frédéric (1701–1781), comte de Maurepas, later comte de Pontchartrain
Paul Jérôme (1703– ?), marquis de Chefboutonne, a soldier
Charles Henri (1706–1734), bishop of Blois

He remarried in July 1713 with Hélène de L'Aubespine (1690–1770), with whom he had two daughters.
Marie Louise (known as Rosalie), (1714–1780)
Hélène Françoise Angélique (1715–1781), who married Louis Jules Mancini Mazarini

In 1715, with the death of Louis XIV and the assumption of power by the Regent, Phélypeaux was compelled to resign his ministries in favour of his son Jean-Frédéric. Effective authority, and later the guardianship of his children, passed to his kinsman Louis Phélypeaux, marquis de La Vrillière.

See also 
 Château de Pontchartrain

Bibliography
 Sara E. Chapman, Private Ambition and Political Alliances  the Phélypeaux de Pontchartrain Family and Louis XVI's Government, 1650-1715. Rochester N.Y. : University of Rochester Press, 2004. .
 Charles Frostin, Les Pontchartrain, ministres de Louis XIV, Presses universitaires de Rennes, Rennes, 2006.
 Jean-Yves Nerzic, La place des armements mixtes dans la mobilisation de l'arsenal de Brest sous les deux Pontchartrain (1688-1697 & 1702-1713), Ed. H&D, 2010, .

1674 births
1747 deaths
Secretaries of State of the Navy (France)
Secretaries of State of Ancien Régime France
Members of the Académie des Inscriptions et Belles-Lettres